The Sâmbotin is a right tributary of the river Jiu in Romania. It flows into the Jiu near the village Sâmbotin. The upper reach of the river is known as Viezuroiu.

References

Rivers of Romania
Rivers of Gorj County